Paved and unpaved roadways, as well as railways, provide the main forms of transport in Madagascar. In 2010, Madagascar had  of navigable waterways.

Railways

In 2018, Madagascar reported 836 km of rail lines. There are several rail lines and stations in Madagascar. Antananarivo is connected to Toamasina, Ambatondrazaka and Antsirabe by rail, and another rail line connects Fianarantsoa to Manakara. The northern railway (TCE) is concessioned to Madarail. The southern line, Fianarantsoa-Côte-Est railway (FCE), is a parastatal line.

Roads

Waterways

The relatively short rivers of Madagascar are typically of local importance only; isolated streams and small portions of Lakandranon' Ampangalana (Canal des Pangalanes) are navigated by pirogue. Coastal inter-city transport routes are found along the west coast.

Madagascar has 600 km of waterways, 432 km of which are navigable.

Ports and harbors
The most important seaport in Madagascar is located on the east coast at Toamasina. Ports at Toliara, Mahajanga, and Antsiranana are significantly less used because of their remoteness. The island's newest port at Port d'Ehola, constructed in 2008 and privately managed by Rio Tinto, will come under state control upon completion of the company's mining project near Tôlanaro around 2038. The country's principal cargo port is Toamasina Autonomous Port.

Airports

The main international airport in Madagascar is Ivato International Airport in Antananarivo. Air Madagascar services the island's many small regional airports, which offer the only practical means of access to many of the more remote regions during rainy season road washouts. There are 26 airports with paved runways and 57 airports with unpaved runways. In 2018, Madagascar carried 544,458 air passengers.

See also

Notes

References

External links
 Helicopter Antananarivo - Helicopter charter service in Antananarivo
 Madagascar Helicopter - Helicopter transfer service
 Report about Madarail and TCE (Tananarive-Côtes Est) by photojournalist Rijasolo